The Perfect Match is a 1988 film directed by a first-time director, Mark Deimel. The story was by It is a romantic comedy which stars Marc McClure, Jennifer Edwards, Diane Stilwell, Rob Paulsen,  Karen Lorre, Jean Byron, Wayne Woodson and Kerry Sherman. The story was by Nick Duretta, David A. Burr and Mark Deimel.

Story
The Perfect Match is a comedy film with Marc McClure and Jennifer Edwards in the lead roles They come together as a result of an ad placed in a lonely hearts column. Tim Wainwright is almost hitting the 30 year old age mark. He wants to find a nice girl. So he puts an ad in the LA Reader and gets dozens of calls with many of them being scary. He's just about ready to give up on this idea, before things change for the better when he gets a reply from Nancy, who seems to be a nice girl. The thing with him is that he is a man who has little ambition and Nancy is a woman who works at a video store and wastes her time taking college classes which don't get her any closer to graduation. Not being totally honest with each other, they both invent inflated career statuses with her claiming to be a professor and him pretending to own a business. The truth starts to come out and they try to deal with it to make things work in their romance. According to Jonathan Rosenbaum, the film is almost identical to Armyan Bernstein's 1987 film Cross My Heart.

Background
This was Mark Deimel's directorial debut. Having raised $875,000 for the film, he began filming in Southern California on June 3, 1986. A year later, it played at the Seattle Film Festival on June 3, 1987. Its theatrical release was in Southern California on May 27, 1988. On June 3, 1988, it had its release in New York City. It did not do well theatrically and by late June that year, it was released on home video.

Cast
 Jennifer Edwards ... Nancy Bryant
 Karen Lorre ... Tammy
 Marc McClure ... Tim Wainwright
 Rob Paulsen ... John Wainwright
 Kerry Sherman English ... Jeannine 
 Diane Stilwell ... Vicki
 Jeane Byron ... Mom
 Wayne Woodson ... Tim's boss

References

External links
 
 The Perfect Match at Cineplex
 
 
 

1988 films
1980s English-language films